Kotschy is a surname. Notable people with the surname include:

 Carl Friedrich Kotschy (1789–1856), Austrian theologian and botanist
 Theodor Kotschy (1813–1866), Austrian botanist and explorer, son of Carl
 Johannes Kotschy (born 1979), Swedish singer and songwriter